30 de Mayo is a neighbourhood in the city of Santo Domingo in the Distrito Nacional of the Dominican Republic. This neighbourhood is populated in particular by individuals from the middle classes.

Sources 
Distrito Nacional sectors 

Populated places in Santo Domingo